The 2021 Porsche Paynter Dixon Carrera Cup Australia, was the seventeenth running of the Porsche Carrera Cup Australia motor racing series. It began at Sandown Raceway on March 19 and ended at Mount Panorama Circuit Bathurst on December 5.

The season's series was won by Cameron Hill.

Calendar

Teams and drivers

Summary

Standings

Pro Championship

Pro–Am Championship

Junior Driver Championship

Endurance Cup Pro

Endurance Cup Pro–Am

References

Australian Carrera Cup Championship seasons
Porsche Carrera Cup
Porsche Carrera Cup Australia